Stir is a 1997 American thriller drama film directed by Rodion Nakhapetov and starring Traci Lords and Tony Todd.

Cast
Traci Lords as Kelly
Andrew Heckler as Joseph
Daniel Roebuck as Michael
Tony Todd as Bubba
Karen Black as Psychiatrist
Reno Wilson as Matt
Rodion Nakhapetov as Businessman

Release
The film was released at the Moscow International Film Festival on July 25, 1997.

Reception
Angela Baldassarre of Variety gave the film a negative review, calling it "an already unpleasant film."

TV Guide also gave the film a negative review: "This is the kind of movie where it takes you an hour to figure out what's going on, by which time you don't care anymore."

References

External links